Walter Ritter/Reichsritter von Molo (14 June 1880, Šternberk, Moravia, Austria-Hungary – 27 October 1958, Hechendorf (now Murnau am Staffelsee, Bavaria, West Germany), was an Austrian writer in the German language.

Life 
Walter von Molo was born on 14 June 1880 in Šternberk, Moravia – then in Austria-Hungary, now in the Czech Republic. He spent his youth in Vienna, the capital. At the Technical University of Vienna he studied mechanical and electrical engineering; he married his first wife, Rosa Richter, in 1906, had a son and daughter, and worked until 1913 as an engineer in the Viennese Patent Office. Shortly before the outbreak of the World War I he moved to Berlin to be with his Bavarian parents and rediscover his German roots, just as Berlin was transforming itself into a cultural capital. It was there that he embarked upon his career as a writer.

His first works, published during and shortly after the war, were bestsellers, and he quickly became one of the most popular of all German-speaking authors of the first half of the century. The books included biographies of Friedrich Schiller, Frederick the Great, and Prince Eugen, as well as novels such as Ein Volk wacht auf ("A People Awakes", 1918–21). All were strongly marked by German nationalism.

In 1925 he divorced Rosa, and five years later married Annemarie Mummenhoff.

Molo was a founding member of the German PEN Club, and also, in 1926, of the Prussian Academy of Arts. From 1928 to 1930 he was chairman of the poetry section.

Although von Molo, a pacifist, had no Jewish forebears, he defended the Jews of Germany and Austria, and with the rise of Nazism he repeatedly drew the anger of anti-Semitic organizations. Molo remained a member of the academy after its purging of Jewish members, and on 15 March 1933 he signed a declaration pledging loyalty to the Nazi leaders. In October he was one of the 88 German writers who went so far as to subscribe to the Vow of Most Faithful Allegiance (Gelöbnis treuester Gefolgschaft) to Adolf Hitler. This was the same year that his two children left Germany. (Conrad returned in 1940; Trude did not.) In 1936 Molo wrote the screenplay for the film Fridericus, based on his novel of 1918. During the World War II he wrote articles for the Nazi-controlled newspaper Krakauer Zeitung published in occupied Kraków.

Although Molo's biography of Frederick II of Prussia was praised by the Nazis, he nevertheless came under attack as unvölkisch, ein Judenfreund and Pazifist (he had, for example, effusively praised the work of Erich Maria Remarque), and there were attempts to push him from public life, with the banning of plays, and the suppression of certain books and their removal from libraries. In 1934, to avoid the public spotlight, he resigned from all the learned societies (except the Goethe Society) and moved to Murnau am Staffelsee, where he had bought property two years before. The idea of exile from Germany itself was unthinkable to him. House searches and defamatory articles continued, and in August 1939 he was denaturalised. However, he was co-writer of the movie script The Endless Road. As a result of the harassment, he destroyed, with the help of his second wife Anne Marie, a large part of his private library, including correspondence with Stefan Zweig, books by Thomas and Heinrich Mann bearing personal dedications, and many papers of his colleagues. All this potentially incriminating material ended up at the bottom of his garden pond. He was never placed under "protective custody" (Schutzhaft) as others were.

After the war he would become a bitter critic of the authors who had fled Germany. On 4 August 1945 an open letter from Molo to Thomas Mann, begging him to return from the United States, was published in the Hessischen Post and other newspapers both in Germany and abroad: "Your people, hungering and suffering for a third of a century, has in its innermost core nothing in common with all the misdeeds and crimes, the shameful horrors and lies...." His sentiments were echoed by Frank Thiess, whose own piece would popularise the use of the phrase innere Emigration to describe the choice of some intellectuals to remain in Germany, a phrase Mann himself had used in 1933. Mann responded, on 28 September, in a statement which caused general indignation in Germany, that new books "published in Germany between 1933 and 1945, can be called less than worthless", that exile had been a sacrifice and not an evasion, and that the nation as a whole did bear responsibility for atrocities committed by its leaders.

This unleashed a huge controversy between the exiled authors and the ones who had chosen to remain. Molo claimed that writers who had abandoned Germany forfeited the right to shape its future.

Despite his appointment as honorary chairman of the German Society of Authors, he did not regain his former prominence. He died on 27 October 1958, and his remains were interred in what is now Molo Park in Murnau. Rosa died in 1970, and Annemarie in 1983.

Works

Stories and novels 

 Klaus Tiedmann der Kaufmann, 1909
 Ums Menschentum. Ein Schillerroman, 1912
 Im Titanenkampf. Ein Schillerroman, 1913
 Der Hochzeitsjunker. Ein Rennroman, 1913
 Die Freiheit. Ein Schillerroman, 1914
 Den Sternen zu. Ein Schillerroman, 1916
 Der Große Fritz im Krieg, 1917
 Schiller in Leipzig, 1917
 Die ewige Tragikomödie. Novellistische Studien 1906-1912, 1917
 Fridericus, novel, 1918
 Luise, novel, 1919
 Auf der rollenden Erde, novel, 1923
 Vom alten Fritz. 4 Erzählungen aus dem Leben des großen Königs, 1924
 Bodenmatz, novel, 1925
 Im ewigen Licht, novel, 1926
 Die Legende vom Herrn, 1927
 Hans Amrung und seine Frau und andere Novellen, 1927
 Mensch Luther, novel, 1928
 Die Scheidung. Ein Roman unserer Zeit, 1929
 Ein Deutscher ohne Deutschland. Ein Friedrich List-Roman, 1931
 Holunder in Polen, novel, 1933
 Der kleine Held, novel, 1934
 Eugenio von Savoy. Heimlicher Kaiser des Reichs, novel, 1936
 Geschichte einer Seele, 1938
 Das kluge Mädchen, novel, 1940
 Der Feldmarschall, 1940
 Sie sollen nur des Gesetzes spotten, stories, 1943
 Im Sommer. Eine Lebenssonate, 2 Erzählungen, 1943
 Der Menschenfreund, novel, 1948
 Die Affen Gottes. Roman der Zeit, 1950

Plays 

 Das gelebte Leben, drama in 4 acts, 1911
 Die Mutter, drama in 4 acts, 1914
 Der Infant der Menschheit, drama in 3 acts, 1916
 Die Erlösung der Ethel, tragedy in 4 acts, 1917
 Friedrich Staps. Ein deutsches Volksstück in 4 Aufzügen, 1918
 Der Hauch im All, tragedy in 3 acts, 1918
 Die helle Nacht, play in 3 acts, 1920
 Till Lausebums, romantic comedy in 3 acts, 1921
 Lebensballade, a play in 12 scenes, 1924
 Ordnung im Chaos, play in 8 tableaux, 1928
 Friedrich List. Ein deutsches Prophetenleben in 3 Aufzügen, 1934

Screenplays 
 Fridericus (D, 1936), directed by Johannes Meyer, with Otto Gebühr, Lil Dagover, Hilde Körber, Agnes Straub, Käthe Haack and others
 The Endless Road (D, 1942/43), directed by Hans Schweikart, with Eugen Klöpfer, Eva Immermann, Hedwig Wangel, Alice Treff and others

Other writings 

 Deutsches Volk. Ein Flugblatt in jedes Haus, 1914
 Als ich die bunte Mütze trug. Deutsch-österreichische Studenten-Erinnerungen, 1914
 An unsere Seelen. Drei Flugblätter auf das Kriegsjahr 1914-1915, 1915
 Deutschland und Oesterreich. Kriegsaufsätze, 1915
 Deutsch sein heißt Mensch sein! Notschrei aus deutscher Seele, 1915
 An Frederik van Eeden und Romain Rolland. Offener Brief, 1915
 Sprüche der Seele, 1916
 Im Schritt der Jahrhunderte. Geschichtliche Bilder, 1917
 Italien. Erlebnisse Deutscher in Italien, 1921
 Im Zwielicht der Zeit. Bilder aus unseren Tagen, 1922
 Der deutschen Jugend gesagt, 1929
 Zwischen Tag und Traum. Gesammelte Reden und Aufsätze, 1930
 Deutsche Volksgemeinschaft. Ansprache am 22. März 1932 in Weimar, 1932
 Wie ich Deutschland möchte. Eine Rede über Friedrich List, 1932
 Lob des Leides, 1947
 Zu neuem Tag. Ein Lebensbericht, 1950
 So wunderbar ist das Leben. Erinnerungen und Begegnungen, 1957
 Wo ich Frieden fand. Erlebnisse und Erinnerungen, 1959

See also 
 Gottfried Benn
 Thomas Mann
 Frank Thiess

Notes

References 
 Werner von Berge: Der lange Weg aus dem Exil. Die Diskussion um die Heimkehr aus dem Exil am Beispiel Thomas Manns und des Streites zwischen "innerer" und "äußerer" Emigration. 1945-1949. Magisterarbeit, Universität Frankfurt am Main 1984
 Babette Dietrich: "Ein Auftrag von höherer Macht ...". Walter von Molo und die Mainzer Literaturklasse 1949-1956. (= Edition Wissenschaft; Reihe Germanistik; 7). Tectum-Verlag, Marburg 1995, 
 Hanns Martin Elster: Walter von Molo und sein Schaffen. Langen, München 1920
 Franz Camillo Munck: Walter von Molo. Der Dichter und das Leben. (= Vom Herzschlag meines Volkes; 2). Koch, Leipzig 1924
 Gustav Christian Rassy: Walter von Molo. Ein Dichter des deutschen Menschen. Bohn, Leipzig 1936
 Karl O. Vitense: Walter von Molo. Das Wesen des Schriftstellers. Dissertation, Universität Leipzig 1936

External links 
 
 Eintrag zu Walter von Molo im Projekt Historischer Roman (Datenbank der Universität Innsbruck)
 Eintrag zu Walter von Molo bei filmportal.de
 
 
 
 Molo Park

1880 births
1958 deaths
People from Šternberk
People from the Margraviate of Moravia
Austrian knights
Moravian-German people
Austrian essayists
20th-century Austrian dramatists and playwrights
Austrian male dramatists and playwrights
Austrian people of Moravian-German descent
20th-century Austrian novelists
Male essayists
20th-century essayists
20th-century Austrian male writers
Commanders Crosses of the Order of Merit of the Federal Republic of Germany